Dhirajlal B. Desai (22 June 1908 – 21 March 1951), popularly known as Dhirubhai, was an Indian diplomat and independence activist. He served as India's first ambassador and plenipotentiary minister to Switzerland. He also served as the President of the Bombay Provincial Congress Committee (BPCC) in 1941. He was born in Bombay, British India and was the son of lawyer and leader, Bhulabhai Desai.

Life and work 
He attended Elphinstone College, Bharda New High School and Government Law College in Bombay. Desai was Barrister at the Supreme Court of India and Chairman of the Indian National Congress in the Bombay Presidency. He was a director of Ameer Trading Corporation, the Indian branch of American Cyanamid's Calco Chemical Company.

Desai served as India's first Ambassador to Switzerland from 17 December 1948 to 21 March 1951. He was elected as the President of the Bombay Provincial Congress Committee (BPCC) in 1941. He was known for his speeches and oratory skills, particularly during the Quit India movement. He was a strong advocate for freedom and self-reliance and often spoke out against the British Empire's attitude towards the Congress party and its denial of the right to free speech.

Desai delivered speeches at various venues in Bombay, including Dana Bunder and Ghodapdev, and often spoke to working-class audiences, encouraging them to spin charkha for at least half an hour a day as a means of earning a small income and becoming self-reliant.

From 17 December 1948, he was accredited as an envoy in Bern and also to the Holy See and to the Allied Commission for Austria in Vienna.

Dhirajlal Desai died of heart attack on 21 March 1951 in Bern at the age of 42.

References 

1908 births
1951 deaths
Ambassadors of India to Switzerland
Ambassadors of India to the Holy See
Indian diplomats
Ambassadors of India
Bombay State politicians
Indian independence activists
Indian independence activists from Maharashtra
Presidents of the Indian National Congress
Indian National Congress politicians from Maharashtra